Olger is a given name. Notable people with the name include:

Olger B. Burtness (1884–1960), American politician and judge
Olger Merkaj (born 1997), Albanian footballer

See also
Folger
Holger (given name)

Masculine given names